Manucihr was an Iranian dynast of an unknown place called Konus in the Pars Province. He was killed in the 200s by the Persian prince Ardashir I, who would later establish the Sasanian Empire.

Sources 
 

 

3rd-century Iranian people
History of Fars Province
Monarchs killed in action
3rd-century monarchs in the Middle East
200s deaths
2nd-century births